XFi, X-Fi or XFI may refer to:

 Sound Blaster X-Fi, a line of PC sound cards from Creative Technology
 xFi Advanced Gateway, an Xfinity WiFi router
 Xfi Centre for Finance and Investment, a research and teaching institute at the University of Exeter
 XFI, the electrical circuit standard for chip-to-chip connection in an XFP transceiver